The 2011–12 season saw Livingston compete in their first season back in the First Division, having been promoted after winning the Scottish Second Division during season 2010–11. They also competed in the Challenge Cup, League Cup and the Scottish Cup.

Summary
Livingston finished fifth in the First Division. They reached the Semi Final of the Challenge Cup, the second round of the League Cup and the fourth round of the Scottish Cup.

Managers
On 5 February 2012 Gary Bollan was sacked by the club, with Brian Welsh being appointed as caretaker manager. Welsh led the club for one game before emigrating to America and on 14 February John Hughes was appointed as manager with John Collins being appointed Director of football.

Results and fixtures

Pre season

Scottish First Division

Scottish Challenge Cup

Scottish League Cup

Scottish Cup

Player statistics

Captains

Squad 
Last updated 5 May 2012

|}

Disciplinary record
Includes all competitive matches.
Last updated 5 May 2012

Awards

Last updated 14 May 2012

Team statistics

League table

Transfers

Players in

Players out

References

Livingston
Livingston F.C. seasons